1984 Grand Prix may refer to:

 1984 Grand Prix (snooker)
 1984 Grand Prix (tennis)